Alyaksandr Yawhenavich Hawrushka ((Aleksandr Gavryushko); born 23 January 1986) is a Belarusian former professional footballer.

Honours
Naftan Novopolotsk
Belarusian Cup winner: 2011–12

References

1986 births
Sportspeople from Potsdam
Living people
Belarusian footballers
Association football forwards
FC Dinamo Minsk players
FC Naftan Novopolotsk players
FC Dnepr Mogilev players
FC Belshina Bobruisk players
FC Slutsk players
FC Orsha players
Footballers from Brandenburg